Water polo at the 1988 Summer Olympics as usual was part of the swimming sport, the other two being swimming and diving. They were not seen as three separate sports, because they all were governed by one federation — FINA. Water polo discipline consisted of one event: the men's team competition.

In the preliminary round twelve teams were divided into two groups. The two best teams from each group (shaded ones) advanced to the semi-finals. The two numbers three and four played classification matches to determine places 5 through 8, with the earlier result taken with them. The rest of the teams also played classification matches to determine places 9 through 12.

Qualification

Squads

Preliminary round

Group A

21 September
Italy 9-9 Soviet Union
France 16-5 South Korea
Australia 11-13 West Germany
22 September
South Korea 1-11 Italy
France 9-10 West Germany
Australia 4-11 Soviet Union
23 September
South Korea 2-18 West Germany
Australia 5-7 Italy
France 4-18 Soviet Union
26 September
Italy 7-10 West Germany
South Korea 4-17 Soviet Union
France 6-7 Australia
27 September
France 8-14 Italy
Australia 13-2 South Korea
Soviet Union 8-9 West Germany

Group B

21 September
Hungary 12-10 Greece
United States 7-6 Yugoslavia
China 6-13 Spain
22 September
Greece 10-7 China
United States 7-9 Spain
Hungary 9-10 Yugoslavia
23 September
United States 14-7 China
Greece 7-17 Yugoslavia
Hungary 6-6 Spain
26 September
United States 18-9 Greece
Hungary 14-7 China
Spain 8-10 Yugoslavia
27 September
Greece 9-12 Spain
Hungary 9-10 United States
Yugoslavia 17-7 China

Final round

Semi finals
30 September
West Germany 10-14 Yugoslavia
Soviet Union 7-8 United States

Bronze medal match
1 October
West Germany 13-14 Soviet Union

Final
1 October
Yugoslavia 9-7 United States

Group D

30 September
 Italy 9-9 Hungary
 Australia 8-7 Spain
1 October
 Australia 5-13 Hungary
 Italy 9-11 Spain

Group E

30 September
 France 11-4 China
 South Korea 7-17 Greece
1 October
 South Korea 7-14 China
 France 7-10 Greece

Final ranking

Top goalscorers

See also
1986 FINA Men's World Water Polo Championship
1991 FINA Men's World Water Polo Championship

References

Sources
 PDF documents in the LA84 Foundation Digital Library:
 Official Report of the 1988 Olympic Games, v.2 (download, archive) (pp. 590–598)
 Water polo on the Olympedia website
 Water polo at the 1988 Summer Olympics (men's tournament)
 Water polo on the Sports Reference website
 Water polo at the 1988 Summer Games (men's tournament) (archived)

External links
Official results

 
1988 Summer Olympics events
O
1988
1988